The following is a list of settlements in North Central Province, Sri Lanka.



A
Achari Madatugama, Acharigama, Achchirikulama, Achirigama, Achiriyagama

B
Badahela Etawetunuwewa, Badahela Ranorewa, Badahelagama, Bakamuna, Bakamuneulpota

C
Challitivu

D
Dachchi Hammillewa, Dachchidamana, Dachihalmillewa, Dahanekwewa, Damala Hammillewa, Diyabeduma

E
Echchankulama, Egodagama, Ehetuwagama, Ehetuwewa, Elagamuwa

F

G
Galagedaragama, Galahitiyagama, Galapitagala, Galapitigala, Galatanwewa

H
Haba Diwulwewa, Haba Kudawewa, Habarana, Habarattawala, Habawewa

I
Ichchankulama, Ihala Amanakkattuwa, Ihala Anduketiyawa, Ihala Angunachchiya, Ihala Bakmigahaulpota

J
Jayanthipura

K
Kabaragoyawewa, Kadadekawewa, Kadadekawewa, Kadahatawewa, Kadandugama, Kalawewa, Kekirawa

L
Labunoruwa, Lenagama, Lewapanikkiyawa, Lindawewa, Lokahettiyagama

M
Madagallegama, Madatugama, Madatungama, Madawachchiya, Madawala

N
Nabadagaswewa, Nabadawewa, Nachchaduwa, Nachchaduwa Palayakulama, Nagadaranewa

O
Obadayagama, Ohomigama, Olobbawa, Olombewa, Olugallewa

P
Pachchalawetiya, Padikaramaduwa, Padiketuwewa, Padikkalamadu Colony, Padikkaramaduwa

Q

R
Rada Hammillewa, Rada Rambewa, Radagama, Radagamawatta, Radapalugaswewa

S
Sakalasuriyagama, Samudragama, Sandanankuttigama, Sandigewewa, Sangattewa

T
Talakolawewa, Talakolewa, Talapatkulama, Talattewa, Talawa

U
Uda Hingura, Uda Korasagalla, Uda Negama, Uda Nidigama, Uda Thibbatuwewa

V
Vadivalaipuliyankulam, Valpotuwewa, Vedenigama, Veheragoda, Vendarankulama, Verumkulama, Viharagawagala, Vihare Hammillewa, Vitaranagama

W
Wadigawewa, Wadiwewa, Waduressagama, Waga Konwewa, Wagayakulama

X

Y

Z

See also
 List of cities in Sri Lanka
 List of towns in Sri Lanka

External links
 Cities and Towns in North Central Province, Sri Lanka

 
North Central Province
North Central Province